Hilaire Frederik Spanoghe (born 30 October 1879, date of death unknown) was a Belgian footballer who competed in the 1900 Olympic Games. In Paris he won a bronze medal as a member of a mixed team representing Belgium that was mostly made-up of students from the Université de Bruxelles.

Biography
Born in Grimbergen to Maria Victoria Van Bogaert (1837) and Amandus Spanoghe (1836), he is the only boy among the couple's five children and the youngest of his siblings. In 1899 he joined Brussels Skill FC, and he stayed loyal to the club until it merged with Daring Club de Bruxelles in 1902, joining Athletic and Running Club de Bruxelles shortly after.

He represented the Belgium Olympic at the 1900 Summer Olympics, featuring in the team's only games at the tournament against Club Français, in which he scored a consolation goal in a 2-6 loss.

Honours

International
Belgium Olympic
Summer Olympics:
Bronze medal (1): 1900

References

External links

1879 births
Year of death missing
Belgian footballers
Olympic bronze medalists for Belgium
Olympic footballers of Belgium
Footballers at the 1900 Summer Olympics
Olympic medalists in football
Association football forwards
Medalists at the 1900 Summer Olympics
Place of death missing
People from Grimbergen
Footballers from Flemish Brabant